Acireductone synthase (EC number 3.1.3.77, E1, E-1 enolase-phosphatase) is an enzyme with systematic name 5-(methylsulfanyl)-2,3-dioxopentyl-phosphate phosphohydrolase (isomerizing). It catalyses the following reaction:

 5-(methylsulfanyl)-2,3-dioxopentyl phosphate + H2O = 1,2-dihydroxy-5-(methylsulfanyl)pent-1-en-3-one + phosphate (overall reaction)
(1a) 5-(methylsulfanyl)-2,3-dioxopentyl phosphate = 2-hydroxy-5-(methylsulfanyl)-3-oxopent-1-enyl phosphate (probably spontaneous)
(1b) 2-hydroxy-5-(methylsulfanyl)-3-oxopent-1-enyl phosphate + H2O = 1,2-dihydroxy-5-(methylsulfanyl)pent-1-en-3-one + phosphate

References

External links 
 

EC 3.1.3